Roxana is a district of the Pococí canton, in the Limón province of Costa Rica.

History 
Roxana was created on 2 July 1971 by Decreto Ejecutivo 1825-G. Segregated from Guápiles.

Geography 
Roxana has an area of  km2 and an elevation of  metres.

It presents a flat landscape in almost all the extension of its territory, with an average altitude of 106 meters on the level of the sea.

It is located in the northeastern region of the country and borders the districts of Cariari to the north, La Rita to the west, Colorado to the east, Guacimo to the south.

Its head, the town of Roxana, is located 10.7 km (16 minutes) to the north of Guápiles and 77.6 km (1 hours 35 minutes) to the northeast of San José the capital of the nation.

Demographics 

For the 2011 census, Roxana had a population of  inhabitants.

Settlements
The population centers that make up the district are:
Neighborhoods (Barrios): La Cruz, Punta de Riel
Villages (Poblados): Anabán, Boca Guápiles (part), Castañal, Cruce, Curia, Curva, Curva del Humo, Esperanza, Humo, Lomas Azules, Maravilla, Mata de Limón, Millón, Milloncito, Oeste, Prado (part), Roxana Tres, San Francisco, San Jorge, Vegas de Tortuguero

Transportation

Road transportation 
The district is covered by the following road routes:
 National Route 247
 National Route 248
 National Route 809
 National Route 810

Economy 

Extensive banana and pineapple cultivation for export purposes is a strong activity in the area.

Roxana, its head, has health and education services. Entertainment services are also offered in recreational areas.

In terms of trade, the sale of groceries and various accessories stands out.

References 

Districts of Limón Province
Populated places in Limón Province